The Soysambu Conservancy was created in 2007 as an entity to conserve the flora, fauna and scenery of Soysambu Ranch, which is to the northwest of Gilgil, Rift Valley Province, Kenya. 
The Conservancy has taken a conservation lease over the ranch, which would be the portal to the proposed Nakuru-Naivasha wildlife corridor.
On the west it shares a boundary of 12.1 km with Lake Nakuru National Park.

History 

Soysambu Ranch has been farmed by Lord Delamere's family since it was founded in 1906. The current operations include a large beef herd, a hay baling operation and an agri-forestry enterprise among others. The owners had always cherished wildlife but had found the cost of securing it exorbitant. This partnership will enshrine public access, best management practices and provide a new business model for everyone in the area to benefit from. This is not so much of a lease as a complete paradigm shift for a previously privately operated agricultural enterprise.

Winston Churchill picnicked by the lake in 1908 after some pigsticking, Evelyn Waugh stayed for a spot of "corridor creeping" in the 1930s.  Jomo Kenyatta came for a small picnic (only 300 dancers) in 1978 (shortly before his death), and Prince Amyn Aga Khan came for lunch in 2001. Part of Tomb Raider 3 was filmed on the northern lakeshore and Simon Combes grew up there and returned later to live there.

Pelican nesting site of regional importance 

The conservancy covers the northern, western and part of the southern shores of Lake Elmenteita. This lake is the last breeding place in Kenya for pelicans, which nest on some rocky islands in the lake.

The pelicans feed in Lake Nakuru, 10 km to the west, and then feed their young with fish they have carried across in their beaks. They generally prey on Tilapia grahamii. Some have escaped into the waters of Lake Elmenteita, where they breed in the Kekopey hot springs.

Notable translocated animal species 

In addition to over 50 mammal species found on Soysambu, some 11 Rothschild's giraffe were translocated on from Lake Nakuru Park in 1995 and a further 1 from Giraffe Manor. This was carried out by KWS in conjunction with the Lewa Wildlife Conservancy lorry. In 2002 a complete family group of Colobus monkeys were moved into the riverine forest from behind Gilgil where their habitat was fast being destroyed. This was facilitated by the Wakuluzi Colobus Trust.

Conservancy projects

1) Fencing project around 2 sides of Soysambu leaving the park on the west and the wildlife corridor to the South East.

2) Operational capital expenditure for rangers' uniforms, equipment and vehicles.

3) Wetland restoration of the Mbaruk rivermouth by putting a bund in the swamp and restoration of the riverine gallery forest by restoring the old furrow.

4) The Elementeita Health Centre needs assistance to complete the construction which DEL started and to equip it. It is hoped that St. Mary's hospital, a neighbour, will operate it as a referral centre.

5) To convert Sugonoi house into a research centre for student activities and wildlife research which allows much better management decisions.

6) Information gathering about the plethora of prehistoric sites and areas of anthropological interest. Also to work with the Museums of Kenya on gazettement of some of the key sites.

7) To develop Lake Elementeita's future status as a World Heritage Site, developing plans and consensus building through consultative workshops.

8) A livestock management project for neighbouring farmers which involves rehabilitating and refilling some cattle dips together with some advice on husbandry. In future SCL should like to assure value addition for their stock marketing services through a milk collection centre and the slaughterhouse.

References

External links 
Official Soysambu Conservancy website 
blog

National parks of Kenya
Geography of Rift Valley Province
Tourist attractions in Rift Valley Province
Protected areas established in 2008
2008 establishments in Kenya